Cycling was part of the 2007 All-Africa Games competition schedule.

Results

Men's 150 km Road Race

Women's 80 km Road Race

Medal table

References 
Sport 123: Men's Road Race
Sport 123: Women's Road Race

2007 All-Africa Games
Cycling at the African Games
2007 in cycle racing
2007 in road cycling